This page details the match results and statistics of the Uganda national football team from 2020 to present.

Results
Uganda's score is shown first in each case.

Notes

References

External links
Uganda » Fixtures & Results 2020 at worldfootball.net
Uganda » Fixtures & Results 2021 at worldfootball.net

Uganda national football team results
2020s in Uganda